Bauhinia Garden is a Home Ownership Scheme and Private Sector Participation Scheme court in Tseung Kwan O, New Territories, Hong Kong near Tseung Kwan O Plaza, The Grandiose and MTR Tseung Kwan O station. It was jointly developed by the Hong Kong Housing Authority and Shui On Group, and has a total of eight blocks built on reclaimed land and was completed in 2001.

Houses

Demographics
According to the 2016 by-census, Bauhinia Garden had a population of 9,684. The median age was 44.7 and the majority of residents (96 per cent) were of Chinese ethnicity. The average household size was 3.1 people. The median monthly household income of all households (i.e. including both economically active and inactive households) was HK$33,560.

Politics
Bauhinia Garden is located in Po Yee constituency of the Sai Kung District Council. It was formerly represented by Tse Ching-fung, who was elected in the 2019 elections until July 2021.

See also

Public housing estates in Tseung Kwan O

References

Tseung Kwan O
Home Ownership Scheme
Private Sector Participation Scheme
Residential buildings completed in 2001